The 1938 NCAA Gymnastics Championships were contested at the first annual NCAA-sanctioned tournament to determine the team and individual national champions of men's collegiate gymnastics in the United States. 

This year's event was hosted by the University of Chicago at the Henry Crown Field House in Chicago, Illinois. 

Hosts Chicago topped the team standings and claimed the inaugural team title.

The individual all-around championship went to Joe Giallombardo from Illinois.

Team results
(H) = Hosts

See also
Pre-NCAA Gymnastics Champions

References

NCAA Men's Gymnastics championship
NCAA Swimming And Diving Championships
NCAA Swimming And Diving Championships